Scott Agnew (born 11 July 1987), nicknamed "aggy", is a Scottish footballer who plays as an attacking midfielder and has returned as a player-coach at East Fife.

Football career

Early years
Born in Prestwick, South Ayrshire, Agnew started his career with Rangers and represented Scotland at youth levels, but he did not make any first team appearances. He moved to Hamilton Academical in 2006, but was released in the summer of 2007. Agnew then joined Alloa Athletic, where he established himself as a first team regular on the left side of midfield and became renowned as a free-kick specialist following his clever free-kicks.

Ayr United & Stranraer
In May 2008, Agnew joined Ayr United on a two-year contract for an undisclosed fee. Following Ayr's promotion to the First Division at the end of the 2008–09 season, and limited first team opportunities, Agnew joined Alloa Athletic on a six-month loan deal. After returning from his loan spell he was loaned straight back out to Stranraer for the remainder of the 2009–10., before joining them on a permanent basis for the 2010–11 season.

Agnew impressed at Stair Park, scoring 13 goals during the 2010–11 season. This form led to him joining Dumbarton at the end of the season.

Dumbarton
Agnew joined the club on 27 May 2011, where he became a firm fans favourite and won the club's Player of the Year award for season 2011–12 after scoring 13 goals and registering 20 assists. Agnew scored an impressive 11 goals for Dumbarton in the 2012–13 SFL First Division, all of them coming after Christmas.

In May 2013, Agnew signed a new one-year deal with Ian Murray's men. He renewed his contract for another season a year later. He committed himself for another season with the Sons in May 2015 but later rejected the contract offer to join recently relegated St Mirren.

St Mirren & Stranraer return
Agnew made his debut for Saints in a 3–1 Scottish Challenge Cup victory over Berwick Rangers on 25 July 2015. The midfielder made an impressive start with his new club, scoring twice in the second half of the match. He was released by St Mirren at the end of the 2015–16 season. He subsequently signed for Scottish League One side Stranraer on a two-year deal, having previously played for the club between 2010 and 2011.

East Fife, Airdrieonians & Raith Rovers 
Agnew joined East Fife in May 2018. After three seasons he left the club by mutual consent in May 2021  and joined Airdrieonians as a player and Assistant Manager he went with Ian Murray to Raith Rovers one of East Fife nearest rivals but lasted a few months and in January 2023 Agnew decided to return to East Fife as a player-coach.

Career statistics

References

External links

1987 births
Living people
Footballers from Irvine, North Ayrshire
Scottish footballers
Rangers F.C. players
Hamilton Academical F.C. players
Alloa Athletic F.C. players
Ayr United F.C. players
Stranraer F.C. players
Dumbarton F.C. players
St Mirren F.C. players
Association football wingers
Scottish Football League players
Scottish Professional Football League players
People from Prestwick
East Fife F.C. players
Footballers from South Ayrshire
Airdrieonians F.C. players